Zim Integrated Shipping Services Ltd., commonly known as ZIM (tsim; a biblical word meaning "a fleet of ships", Numbers 24:24), is a publicly held Israeli international cargo shipping company, and one of the top 20 global carriers. The company's headquarters are in Haifa, Israel; Originating in 1945, ZIM has traded on the New York Stock Exchange since 2021. From 1948 to 2004, it traded as ZIM Israel Navigation Company.

History
ZIM was founded on June 7, 1945, as the ZIM Palestine Navigation Company Ltd, by the Jewish Agency, the Israel Maritime League and the Histadrut (General Federation of Laborers in the Land of Israel). The first ship  was purchased in partnership with Harris and Dixon (based in London) in 1947. This vessel was refurbished, renamed SS Kedma, and sailed to the future state of Israel in the summer of 1947. After the State of Israel was established in 1948, the company was renamed ZIM Israel Navigation Company Ltd. During its first years, its main task was transporting hundreds of thousands of immigrants to the emerging state. Some of the other ships that had been used for clandestine immigration before the establishment of Israel as a state were confiscated by the British Mandate authorities and later joined the company's fleet. The company continued to purchase more ships, among them were SS Negba, SS Artza and SS Galila.

During 1947–1949 Palestine war, the company was the sole maritime connection with the State of Israel, supplying food, freight and military equipment.

In 1953, some of the money from the reparations agreement between Israel and West Germany was allocated to the purchase and construction of new ships. The ,  renamed Jerusalem, sailed the Israel-New York route, Another ship purchased with reparations money was the SS Theodor Herzl . 

1957 saw the delivery of two more new ocean liners, the 10,000 ton sister ships SS Jerusalem and SS Theodor Herzl, followed by the more modest, 7,800 ton SS Moledetin 1961, which featured an all-Tourist Class layout, targeted principally to American tourists looking for affordable transportation to the Holy Land. 

In 1950s and 1960s, ZIM concentrated on passenger ships, alongside a constant expansion of the cargo shipping business. Passenger liners were a common means of international transport before the emergence of cheap air transport, and pleasure cruises were also popular. ZIM sailed the Mediterranean Sea, as well as having regular routes to the United States. Some of its ships cruised to the Caribbean during the winter. 1964 saw the completion of the 25,000 ton ocean liner , which turned out to be a failure, marking the end of the ZIM passenger shipping era.

Due to rising airline competition and the market failure of the expensive new Shalom, passenger services were gradually phased out between 1966-1969, as ZIM refocused on cargo shipping. Jerusalem was chartered out to British-based P&O Cruises in 1966 to become their Miami, then sold entirely in 1968. The sisters Israel and Zion were both sold in 1966, while the expensive, new Shalom was retired and sold in 1967. Theodor Herzl and Moledet completed ZIM's final transatlantic passenger sailings during 1969 and were sold off, marking the end of the company's passenger division.

ZIM was invited in 1957 by the Government of Ghana to assist the setting up and management of a national shipping line. Black Star Line was formed with a 40% participation by ZIM and principally operated cargo services from West Africa. A similar joint venture - Burma Five Star Line - was made with the Burmese Government in 1959.

During the 1960s, ZIM started to turn its focus to cargo ships, and obtained several special-purpose vessels, including refrigerated ships and oil tankers. ZIM transported crude oil from Iran to Israel and oil byproducts from Israel to Europe.

In the 1970s, ZIM expanded into the container shipping business. ZIM ordered six such ships, and gradually made this its main line of business.

In 1981, one of the company's ships, Mezada, was lost at sea.  Despite a lull in maritime shipping at the beginning of the 1980s, the company built 15 more ships in Germany in the 1990s. At this time, the ownership of ZIM was divided between the Israeli government and Israel Corporation.

In 2008, ZIM planned to launch an initial public offering and selling 25% of its shares on the Hong Kong Stock Exchange, but due to the onset of the global economic crisis it was called off. In 2009, ZIM required a cash injection of $450 million by the Ofer family and debt restructuring  following the world's container shipping downturn.

In 2010, ZIM regained profitability and in early 2011 ZIM renewed its plans for a flotation on the Hong Kong Stock Exchange, but again had to postpone it due to the economic downturn and the drop in container shipping rates.

In 2014, unloading of a ZIM ship at the Port of Oakland was delayed by anti-Israel protesters. Longshoremen declined to load the ship out of safety concerns, taking no position on the underlying dispute, but unloaded the ship after their safety was assured. Other protests in Los Angeles and  Tacoma, Washington failed to stop the unloading of cargo from ZIM ships. A second demonstration bypassed Oakland for Los Angeles when longshoremen, not participating in the protest, refused to unload the ship after being physically threatened and their vehicles blocked when they tried to report for work. Protesters' claim they impacted ZIM's shipping schedule was denied by the company, and the local Jewish Community Council denounced the "hateful" rhetoric of the demonstrators.

In July 2014, by which time the company was almost wholly owned by Israel Corporation, ZIM was restructured with 68% of the group's shares owned by its creditors and bondholders, and 32% retained by Israel Corporation, and starting early 2015 by Kenon Holdings, a spin-off company of Israel Corporation.

In mid-to-late 2015, plans to revive an initial public offering were implemented. ZIM debuted on the New York Stock Exchange in January 2021, with the backing of Citigroup, Goldman Sachs, and Barclays.

In March 2021, Zim reported the biggest profit in its 75-year history.

Privatization
In 2004, the Israel Corporation (which is controlled by the Ofer Brothers Group) purchased 49% of ZIM's shares held by the Israeli government, becoming the sole owner of the company. The new official name after privatization became ZIM Integrated Shipping Services. The purchase deal for about five hundred million New Israeli Shekels was severely criticized by the press and the State Comptroller of Israel as being undervalued and becoming just another flag of convenience company. In 2007, ZIM sold its maritime logistics and forwarding services subsidiary NewLog to UTi Worldwide.

Operational statistics
Annual turnover 2018: $3.2 billion
TEU's Carried in 2018: 2,914,000 million
Total TEU Capacity (owned and chartered vessels): 344,460 TEU's
Containers: over 547,000 TEUs of various types
About 70 vessels, 13 fully or partly owned
Ports of Call: 180 throughout the world, with 10 strategically located hubs
Services: Over 70 lines and services, mostly on a weekly, fixed-day basis, covering all major trade routes with regional connections
Employees: ~4200
Regional Headquarters: Haifa (Israel), Norfolk, Virginia (USA), Liverpool (United Kingdom), Hamburg (Germany), Hong Kong
Agents: ZIM has more than 170 offices and representatives in over 100 countries throughout the world

Fleet

See also
 Israel Corporation
 Zodiac Maritime
 Edmond Wilhelm Brillant
 Top container shipping companies

References

External links 
 
 Zim Israel Navigation Company Ltd.: The Fifty-Years Success Story of a Shipping Company, 1945–1995 by Chaim Bar-Tikva. Haifa, 1996
 The Test of Maritime Sovereignty: The Establishment of the Zim National Shipping Company and the Purchase of the Kedmah, 1945–1952by Kobi Cohen-Hattab. Israel Studies, Volume 20, Number 2, Summer 2015, pp. 110-134, Indiana University Press

Shipping companies of Israel
Container shipping companies
Water transport in Israel
Multinational companies headquartered in Israel
Companies based in Haifa
Transport companies established in 1945
Israeli brands
Formerly government-owned companies of Israel
Companies listed on the New York Stock Exchange